Doris cameroni is a species of sea slug, a dorid nudibranch, a marine gastropod mollusk in the family Dorididae.

Distribution
This species was described from New South Wales, Australia. It has been reported from New South Wales to South Australia.

References

Dorididae
Gastropods described in 1947